Charles Graham may refer to:

Politicians
 Charles Graham (Western Australian politician) (1867–1938), Australian politician
 Charles Graham (Queensland politician) (1839–1886), member of the Queensland Legislative Assembly
 Charles Christie Graham (1835–1915), New Zealand politician
 Charles Graham (American politician) (born 1951), member of the North Carolina General Assembly
 Charles P. Graham (1839–1904), Adjutant General of Connecticut
 Charles Everett Graham (1844–1921), physician and politician in Quebec
 Chuck Graham (1965-2020), Missouri state senator

Others
 Charles Graham (artist) (1852–1911), American artist
 Charles Graham (rugby union) (1876–1944), rugby union player who represented Australia
 Charles Graham (bishop) (1834–1912), British clergyman
 Charles E. Graham (1865–1948), American film actor
 Charles K. Graham (1824–1889), sailor in the antebellum United States Navy, attorney, and brigadier
 Charlie Graham (1878–1948), baseball catcher, manager and team owner

See also
 Sir Charles Percy Graham-Montgomery, 6th Baronet Stanhope (1855–1930), English aristocrat